The Danish Women Workers' Union (KAD) was a general union representing women working in what were perceived to be lower-skilled jobs, in Denmark.

The first union for women in Denmark was founded in 1885, the "Women Workers' Union" (KAF).  It initially represented cleaners and laundry workers, but from 1890 also admitted women working in factories.  From 1892, it was led by Olivia Nielsen, and it expanded from Copenhagen into other cities.  By 1900, it had about 1,000 members, and this led it to establish a new, national union, the "Danish Women Workers' Union", in 1901.

The union affiliated to the Danish Confederation of Trade Unions (LO), and by 1920, it organised about 20% of the women in the trade union movement.  By 1997, it had 88,232 members, of whom 70% worked in the private sector.  About half its members worked in production, 20% in community services, 20% in private services, and the remainder in a wide variety of sectors.

At the end of 2004, the union merged with the Danish General Workers' Union, to form the United Federation of Danish Workers.

Presidents

References

General unions
Trade unions in Denmark
Trade unions established in 1901
Trade unions disestablished in 2004
1901 establishments in Denmark
2004 disestablishments in Denmark